Sappukei is the third studio album by Japanese rock band Number Girl, released on July 17, 2000. It peaked at number 82 on the Oricon Albums Chart. It was ranked at number 37 on Snoozers "100 Greatest Japanese Albums of All Time."

Track listing

Charts

References

External links
 

2000 albums
Number Girl albums
Albums produced by Dave Fridmann
Albums recorded at Tarbox Road Studios